Hemiancistrus is a genus of suckermouth armored catfishes. These species are native to South America. The taxonomy of this genus is complex and unclear, and major work has to be done. Many of these fish are popular aquarium fish.

Taxonomy
Hemiancistrus is a genus within the tribe Ancistrini of the subfamily Hypostominae. This genus has long been used as a "dump" for Loricariid species; fish with unclear relationships have been classified as members of this genus. As such, this taxon is not monophyletic. At this point, many undescribed species remain.

This genus and the closely related Peckoltia may be synonymous, as neither genus is supported by synapomorphies. Hemiancistrus species differ from other members of the Panaque clade lacking the synapomorphies of the other genera and having the dentaries meeting at an angle greater than 120°; in Peckoltia species, the dentaries meet at less than 90° Generally, Peckoltia are considered to be those that have dorsal saddles and bands in the fins, while Heminancistrus have spots and uniform coloration.

What species belong to this genus has been unclear. Many newer species have been tentatively assigned to Hemiancistrus. Although the recently described H. micrommatos and H. spinosissimus have been considered synonyms of H. spilomma by Armbruster, they have more recently been considered valid. H. micrommatos, H. spinosissimus and H. spilomma are currently placed in the genus Ancistomus. Hemiancistrus medians is larger than most species that were left in Hemiancistrus, has well-developed keels (only present elsewhere in ‘H.’ landoni), and a different body shape. The remainder of the taxa that do not have established genera that they can be placed in will be recognized as species groups in ‘Hemiancistrus’ in single quotes until they can be examined further.

Species
There are currently 12 recognized species in this genus:

 Hemiancistrus cerrado L. S. de Souza, M. R. S. de Melo, Chamon & Armbruster, 2008
 Hemiancistrus chlorostictus A. R. Cardoso & L. R. Malabarba, 1999
 Hemiancistrus fuliginosus A. R. Cardoso & L. R. Malabarba, 1999
 Hemiancistrus furtivus Provenzano & Barriga, 2017
 Hemiancistrus guahiborum Werneke, Armbruster, Lujan & Taphorn, 2005
 Hemiancistrus landoni C. H. Eigenmann, 1916
 Hemiancistrus medians Kner, 1854
 Hemiancistrus megalopteryx A. R. Cardoso, 2004
 Hemiancistrus meizospilos A. R. Cardoso & J. F. P. da Silva, 2004
 Hemiancistrus punctulatus A. R. Cardoso & L. R. Malabarba, 1999
 Hemiancistrus subviridis Werneke, Sabaj Pérez, Lujan & Armbruster, 2005
 Hemiancistrus votouro A. R. Cardoso & J. F. P. da Silva, 2004

Distribution and habitat 
Hemiancistrus species are mainly found in tropical and subtropical South America east of the Andes, but there is also species (‘H.’ landoni) in Pacific coast drainages of Colombia and Ecuador. The genus exhibits a large distribution area ranging from the Panama, in Central America, to southern Brazil. Many Hemiancistrus originate from the Guyanas, the Negro and Orinoco and the southern Amazonian tributaries. These fish prefer flowing water habitats of medium to large rivers.

Appearance and anatomy 
Hemiancistrus are members of the family Loricariidae, the armored suckermouth catfishes. As such, they have armor plating on their body instead of scales. Also, they have a suckermouth which they use to cling to rocks in their habitat. They have the characteristic Loricariid omega iris as well. Like many other catfish, Hemiancistrus have strong pectoral and dorsal fin spines that can be locked outwards as a defense.

Hemiancistrus species are rather small to medium-sized Loricariid species. The largest species of the genus, ‘H.’ megalopteryx, reaches about 29 centimetres (12 in). These fish also tend to be spotted or uniform in coloration.

In the aquarium
Hemiancistrus species are popular aquarium fish. Many species are relatively small and attractively colored. ‘Hemiancistrus’ subviridis is one such example, a bright green fish with yellow spots. However, ‘H.’ guahiborum is only rarely imported; despite being common in its natural habitat, it is less attractive than ‘H.’ subviridis, which occurs in the same area.

References

Ancistrini
Fish of South America
Fish of the Amazon basin
Freshwater fish genera
Catfish genera
Taxa named by Pieter Bleeker